The second season of the American television drama series Sin senos sí hay paraíso, comprising 87 episodes, aired on Telemundo from 25 July 2017 to 28 November 2017. The show was broadcast from Monday to Friday at 9pm/8c.

The second season revolves around Catalina Santana, who becomes an undercover agent of the DEA and changes her name to Virginia Fernández after pretending to be dead for 20 years. Catalina returns to Colombia to protect her family from Las Diablas, but her return only causes pain, disappointment, and tragedy for her mother.

The season premiered with a total of 1.82 million viewers, becoming the most watched Spanish-language show at 9pm/8c on Telemundo. The final episode of the season averages a total of 2.03 million viewers, this being the production in Spanish-language most seen at 9pm/8c.

Cast and characters

Main characters 
 Carmen Villalobos as Catalina Santana / Virgina Fernández, she is an agent of the DEA.
 Catherine Siachoque as Hilda Santana, mom of the Catalinas. After learning that her oldest daughter was not dead, she faints, which causes her to lose her memory after an operation.
 Fabián Ríos as Albeiro Marín, Catalina Marín's father. 
 Majida Issa as Yésica Beltrán / La Diabla, Daniela's mother. After being imprisoned in a prison in the United States, she escapes and begins her revenge against Las Catalinas.
 Carolina Gaitán as Catalina Marín, daughter of Albeiro and Hilda and little sister of Catalina Santana.
 Roberto Manrique as Santiago Sanín, he is a doctor who falls in love with Catalina Santana, and has two children with her Mariana and Sebastián. Later it is revealed that he had a child out of wedlock.
 Gregorio Pernía as Aurelio Jaramillo / El Titi, after helping the Marín and Marcial family to unmask La Diabla, he returns to the drug trafficking business and becomes the main enemy of all.
 Johanna Fadul as Daniela Barrera, daughter of La Diabla.
 Juan Pablo Urrego as Hernán Darío, is the boyfriend of Catalina Marín, but because of Mariana they both end their relationship, but they are together at the end.
 Francisco Bolívar as José Luis Vargas / Jota, Godfather of Catalina Marin and long-time best friend of Albeiro.
 Juan Alfonso Baptista as Martín Cruz, he is an agent of the DEA, which in the end is discovered to be a psychopath.

Special guest stars 
 Juan Pablo Llano as Daniel Cerón, he is a journalist who helps the Marín family.
 Gisella Aboumrad as Mayra Contreras, she is an inmate that La Diabla knows in jail, and turns her into her partner.
 Juan Diego Sánchez as Bayron Santana, he is the deceased son of Hilda. He only appears as an illusion that has Hilda in the mental sanatorium.
 Luces Velásquez as Imelda Beltrán, Yésica's mother.
 Juan Ángel Esparza as Villa, he is a Mexican drug trafficker.

Recurring characters 
 Joselyn Gallardo as Martina, daughter of Paola. During the season she is allied with the TEA to destroy El Titi, but dies during a confrontation with El Titi.
 Estefanía Gómez as Vanessa Salazar, after seeing her daughter die, she takes revenge on Las Diablas and manages money to get and continue her courtship with Jota.
 Manuel Antonio Gómez as Esteban Calvo, he is one of the security men of La Diabla. After the confrontation he had with the Marín family in one of the mansions of La Diabla, he survives and falls in love with Hilda.
 Carolina Sepúlveda as Ximena, Valentina's mom.
 Jennifer Arenas as Valentina Fonseca, best friend of Catalina Marín, daughter of Ximena.
 Alejandra Ávila as Celia Morán, she is the secretary and lover of Anibal.
 Marilyn Patiño as Lucía Barrios, she is Daniel's girlfriend
 Óscar Salazar as Capitán Pérez, he is the commander of the police, he is a corrupt man who tries to destroy the Marín family by orders of Daniela.
 Jonathan Cabrera as Carlos Mario / El Chuky, he is one of the security men of Marcial.
 María Alejandra Pinzón as Paola Pizarro, Martina's mom.
 Laura García as López, she is the security guard where La Diabla remains while she was in prison.
 Esmeralda Pinzón as Sandra, she is a recluse, who manages to flee from prison along with La Diabla and her friends, but dies when she fled.
 Michelle Manterola as Flavia, she is one of the partners of La Diabla.
 Stephania Duque as Mariana Sanín, daughter of Catalina Santana and Santiago.
 Johan Esteban Díaz as Sebastián Sanín, son of Catalina Santana and Santiago.
 Eileen Roca as Zoraya, ex-girlfriend of Santiago, with whom he had a child out of wedlock.
 Damián Alcázar as Don Chalo, it's a Mexican narco.
 Abril Schreiber as Claudia Romero, she is a high school student, who commits suicide while trying to prostitute herself with Gato Gordo.
 Elianis Garrido as Dayana Muriel, she is the new pimp in the neighborhood.
 Julián Farietta as Gatillo, he is a hit man hired by La Diabla.
 Álvaro Benet as Miguel Díaz, is the new head of the TEA, after discovering that Martin was a psychopath.
 Luis Fernando Bohórquez as Coronel Granados, after the death of Captain Peréz, he becomes the new head of the police.

Episodes

References 

2017 American television seasons
Sin senos sí hay paraíso